"False Memories" is a story arc that ran through Buffy the Vampire Slayer #35–38 based on the Buffy the Vampire Slayer television series. The arc was later collected into a trade paperback edition.

Story description

General synopsis
"Remember that time when Buffy's little sister Dawn first found out that Buffy is the Slayer? And then when Angel almost killed Dawn, because no one had told her that he'd turned evil again?"

Buffy and her friends all have memories about Dawn Summers, yet only Buffy and Giles have discovered those memories are not real. Buffy and Giles are still lacking real answers about those memories. Meanwhile, Dawn vanishes without a trace, and the Scoobies have no idea where she is. Buffy will stop at nothing to find Dawn.

Buffy the Vampire Slayer #35
Comic title: Remember The Beginning

Dawn has fourteen years of memories including the time she first discovered Buffy was the Slayer, the time when Angel tried to kill her, and so on. Only Buffy and Giles are aware that such memories are not real. Dawn is linked to other secrets from the past, namely a previous slayer who is still the victim of a curse.

Buffy the Vampire Slayer #36
Comic title: Remember The Lies

Dawn has vanished without a trace and the Scooby gang has no clue where to find her.

As the Scooby gang try to find Dawn, Buffy causes chaos in the town during her search. Spike thinks that Dawn's disappearance might be linked to the former Slayer turned vampire, Yuki Makumura. A battle between Vampire Slayer and Slayer Vampire maybe approaching.

Buffy the Vampire Slayer #37
Comic title: Remember The Truth

Buffy is looking for clues related to her sister, and Harmony thinks up another plan to cause trouble and she distracts people from the search for Dawn. Meanwhile, crazy vampire monks who know about Dawn's past are holding her captive. Also, the Slayer-Vampire is on Buffy's case.

Buffy the Vampire Slayer #38
Comic title: Remember The End 

Buffy and her friends face off against the Buddhist vampire-monks who had kidnapped Dawn. The monks know all about Dawn. Buffy must handle new information and face a fight with a Slayer-Vampire.

Continuity
Supposedly set in Buffy season 5, the story arc contains various flashbacks to previous events from Dawn's perspective.
The arc takes place after Haunted, and before Willow & Tara.

Canonical issues

Buffy comics such as this one are not usually considered by fans as canonical. However, unlike fan fiction, overviews summarizing their story, written early in the writing process, were 'approved' by both Fox and Joss Whedon (or his office), and the books were therefore later published as officially Buffy merchandise.